Waqf (Arabic: وَقْف‎; [ˈwɑqf]), also known as hubous (حُبوس) or mortmain property is an inalienable charitable endowment under Islamic law.

Waqf or the plural Awqaf (Arabic: أوقاف) can also refer to:

Waqf
 Al Waqf, Egypt, city
 Al-Waqf, Syria, village
 Al-Waqf, Yemen, village
 WAQF Tower, a skyscraper in Niamey, Niger

Awqaf
 AWQAF Africa, waqf serving all countries of Africa
 Al-Awqaf Library, an Iraqi library located near the Iraq National Library and Archive
 Ministry of Awqaf (Egypt)

See also
Waqf-e-Jadid (also known as The New Dedication), a scheme initiated in 1957, launched to spread Islam and Ahmadiyyat in remote areas of Pakistan, especially in the province of Sindh